Yurdhai-ye Miraki (also Romanized as Yūrdhāī-ye Mīrakī) is a village in Sarvestan Rural District, in the Central District of Sarvestan County, Fars Province, Iran. At the 2006 census, its population was 21, in 6 families.

References 

Populated places in Sarvestan County